The Taylor Hill Hotel is a historic former hotel building at 409 Alabama Street in Coal Hill, Arkansas.  Now a private residence, it is a two-story wood-frame I-house, with a gabled roof and weatherboard siding.  A two-story ell extends to the rear, giving the building a T shape.  A two-story porch extends across much of the front, supported by square columns.  The building has a mixture of simple Greek Revival and Folk Victorian details.  It was probably built about 1890, when Coal Hill was the largest city in Johnson County.

The building was listed on the National Register of Historic Places in 2008.

See also
National Register of Historic Places listings in Johnson County, Arkansas

References

Houses on the National Register of Historic Places in Arkansas
Hotel buildings on the National Register of Historic Places in Arkansas
National Register of Historic Places in Johnson County, Arkansas
Hotel buildings completed in 1890
Buildings and structures in Johnson County, Arkansas
Hotels in Arkansas